Gu Jiaming (born 1964 in Jingzhou, Hubei) is a retired female badminton player from China.

Career
She won the bronze medal at the 1987 IBF World Championships in the women's singles. The following year she won the women's singles at the prestigious All-England Championships beating Korea's Lee Young-suk and she played the winning singles for China's world champion Uber Cup (women's international) team.

Achievements

World Championships 
Women's singles

IBF World Grand Prix 
The World Badminton Grand Prix sanctioned by International Badminton Federation (IBF) from 1983 to 2006.

Women's singles

Invitational tournament 

Women's singles

References

Chinese female badminton players
Living people
1964 births
Asian Games medalists in badminton
Badminton players at the 1986 Asian Games
Badminton players from Hubei
Asian Games gold medalists for China
Medalists at the 1986 Asian Games
21st-century Chinese women
20th-century Chinese women